Nika Mühl (born 9 April 2001) is a Croatian college basketball player for the UConn Huskies of the Big East Conference. She plays the point guard position.

Club career

ŽKK Trešnjevka 2009
Mühl played four seasons for ŽKK Trešnjevka 2009 in the Croatian Prva Ženska Liga, from 2016 to 2020. She appeared in 24 games in the Prva liga in her first season, averaging 6.4 points, 4.2 rebounds and 2.8 assists. The following season she averaged 9.2 points, 6.9 rebounds og 5.0 assists in the Prva Ženska Liga and 11.7 points, 5.8 rebounds and 4.5 assists in the Women Adriatic Basketball Association (WABA).

In 2018–2019, she averaged 10.0, 7.9 and 6.2 assists in the Prva Ženska Liga and 11.7 points, 7.7 rebounds and 6.2 assists in the WABA. She continued her stellar performance with Trešnjevka during the 2019–2020 season, Mühl averaged 8.6 points and 7.1 assists in the Prva Ženska Liga and 11.7 points and 7.2 assists in the WABA.

College career

Recruiting 
Mühl received scholarship offers from NCAA Division I basketball programs to include, Oregon, Ohio State, Louisville, and USF. On April 8, 2019, Mühl announced her commitment to University of Connecticut. On November 13, 2019, Mühl signed a National Letter of Intent with UConn.

Freshman 
During her freshman season, Mühl averaged 5.0 points, 2.7 assists, 2.4 rebounds, and 1.8 steals across 22 games. She made 14 consecutive starts. On 25 February 2021, she scored a season high 19 points in an 81-49 victory against Creighton. In UConn’s first game against High Point in the NCAA Tournament, Mühl rolled her ankle and needed to be helped off the court. She missed the next three games and was unable to return to form in the Final Four.

Sophomore 
Mühl was named Big East Defensive Player of the Year for the 2021–22 season after averaging 2.2 steals per game, second best in the Big East, and headlining the Huskies defense which allowed a league best of 50.8 points per game against conference opponents.

Junior 
With Paige Bueckers out for the season, Mühl became UConn’s most important player. Mühl took on the role of leader on both the defensive and offensive end. On November 20th, 2022 she set the program record for most assists in a single game with 15 against NC State, record held previously by teammate Paige Bueckers. She also has led the nation in assists per game for most of the 2022-2023 season, only falling behind Caitlin Clark by .2 assists. In the final regular-season game against Xavier, Mühl recorded seven assists to bring her season total to 236, five more than the school record set by Sue Bird in 2002.

National team career
Represented Croatia at the 2018 FIBA U18 European Championship averaging 10.9 points, 5.7 assists, and 5.0 rebounds per game.

Career statistics

College

|-
| style="text-align:left;"| 2020–21
| style="text-align:left;"| UConn
| 23 || 15 || 24.4 || 38.1 || 34.3 || 72.7 || 2.4 || 2.7 || 1.7 || 0.2 || 1.9 || 4.9

|-
| style="text-align:left;"| 2021–22
| style="text-align:left;"| UConn
| 33 || 19 || 21.7 || 43.1 || 34.2 || 22.2 || 3.0 || 2.6 || 1.4 || 0.2 || 1.5 || 3.8

|-
| style="text-align:left;"| 2022–23
| style="text-align:left;"| UConn 
| 15 || 15 || 34.8 || 42.9 || 34.1 || 63.0 || 3.9 || 9.0 || 1.5 || 0.1 || 3.3 || 6.5

Personal life
Mühl was born in Zagreb, Croatia to parents Roberta and Darko Mühl, both of whom played basketball. She has one younger sister, Hana Mühl.

Awards and honors
College
 Big East Defensive Player of the Year (2022)
 Big East Defensive Player of the Year (2023)

References

External links
UConn Huskies Bio
ESPN Player Overview
FIBA
EUROBASKET

Living people
2001 births
Croatian expatriate basketball people in the United States
Croatian Women's Basketball League players
Croatian women's basketball players
Point guards
UConn Huskies women's basketball players